Ryan Moore (born December 8, 1983) is a former American football wide receiver. Moore played high school football at Dr. Phillips High School. He played wide receiver for Miami. He was signed as a free agent by the Jacksonville Sharks.

References

External links
 Jacksonville Sharks Bio

1983 births
Living people
American football wide receivers
Miami Hurricanes football players
Jacksonville Sharks players
Players of American football from Orlando, Florida
Allen Wranglers players
Nebraska Danger players
Dr. Phillips High School alumni